Puccinia substriata var. indica is a plant pathogen infecting pearl millet.

References

External links 
 Index Fungorum
 USDA ARS Fungal Database

Fungal plant pathogens and diseases
Pearl millet diseases
substriata var. indica